The Roman Catholic Diocese of Ambikapur is a diocese located in the city of Ambikapur in the Ecclesiastical province of Raipur in India.

History
 10 November 1977: Established as Diocese of Ambikapur from the Diocese of Raigarh–Ambikapur

Leadership
 Bishops of Ambikapur (Latin Rite)
 Bishop Antonis Bara (22 December 2021 – present)
 Bishop Patras Minj, S.J. (5 July 1996 – 22 December 2021)
 Bishop Paschal Topno, S.J. (later Archbishop) (28 October 1985 – 26 March 1994)
 Bishop Philip Ekka, S.J. (10 November 1977 – 20 October 1984)

References

External links
 GCatholic.org 
 Catholic Hierarchy 

Roman Catholic dioceses in India
Christian organizations established in 1977
Roman Catholic dioceses and prelatures established in the 20th century
1977 establishments in Madhya Pradesh
Christianity in Chhattisgarh
Surguja district